Phyllis Louise Smith (born July 10, 1951) is an American actress and casting associate. She is best known for playing Phyllis Vance in the television series The Office and her critically acclaimed voice role as Sadness in the film Inside Out. She also starred as Betty Broderick-Allen on the critically-acclaimed Netflix series The OA.

Early life
Smith was born in St. Louis in 1951. She is the second eldest of nine siblings. She graduated from Cleveland High School in 1968.

Education 
Smith graduated from the University of Missouri–St. Louis in 1972 with a degree in elementary education. In the 1970s and 1980s, she worked as a dancer, a cheerleader for the St. Louis Cardinals football team, and a burlesque performer. She said that there was "no stripping, but I did wear feathers." She was forced to quit dancing after suffering a knee injury. Following this, Smith worked briefly as a telemarketer, lasting only three hours before resigning. She later worked in Hollywood, California, as an actress and in casting. Smith’s first paid acting role was as an extra in the film Caddyshack.

Career
Smith was working as a casting associate under the direction of Allison Jones on the television series The Office, when she was offered the role of Phyllis Lapin, a character created specifically for her, a soft-spoken saleswoman who tended to disagree with pompous office manager Michael Scott. She received Screen Actors Guild Awards in 2006 and 2007 for her performance in The Office in the category "Outstanding Performance by an Ensemble in a Comedy Series". In June 2008, Smith appeared with the cast of The Office on Celebrity Family Feud. In 2011, she played a supporting role in the film Bad Teacher. In 2015, she voiced the character Sadness in the Pixar film Inside Out, receiving high critical praise for her performance. Later, she appeared as a regular in the Netflix series The OA.

Filmography

Film

Television

Video games

Production work

References

External links

 Deadspin profile

1951 births
Actresses from St. Louis
American female dancers
American dancers
American film actresses
American television actresses
American female erotic dancers
American erotic dancers
Annie Award winners
American burlesque performers
Living people
National Football League cheerleaders
People from St. Louis County, Missouri
University of Missouri alumni
University of Missouri–St. Louis alumni
American cheerleaders
21st-century American actresses
American voice actresses